Yaghi is a lake in the northeast of Estonia, close to its border with Russia and the coastline of the Gulf of Finland.

See also
List of lakes of Estonia

Lakes of Estonia
Alutaguse Parish
Lakes of Ida-Viru County